The Slippery Elm Trail is a rail to trail conversion in Wood County, Ohio that runs 13 miles from Bowling Green, through Portage and Rudolph, to North Baltimore, Ohio.

History

The Bowling Green Railroad Company was founded in 1874. It functioned as a spur line to link Bowling Green to the Cincinnati, Hamilton, and Dayton Railway (C.H. & D.) that ran northwest of Bowling Green, through Tontogany, Ohio.  In 1887, the CH&D railroad purchased enough stock to control the Bowling Green line. In 1890, the Bowling Green Railroad Company absorbed the portion of railroad that makes today's trail, which was then called the Toledo, Findlay and Springfield Railroad. The line was later purchased by the Baltimore and Ohio Railroad in 1917, and operated as B&O until 1978.

The Wood County Parks District opened the rail trail in 1995.

Location

The trail is maintained by the Wood County Parks District, and the routing is per the following table:

External links
 Google Maps: Slippery Elm Trail, Ohio
 TrailLink: Slippery Elm Trail
 Ohio Bikeways: Slippery Elm Trail
 Wood County Park District: Slippery Elm Trail

References

Rail trails in Ohio
Protected areas of Wood County, Ohio
Tourist attractions in Wood County, Ohio
Bike paths in Ohio
Rail trails in the United States
Transportation in Wood County, Ohio
Bowling Green, Ohio